The Kirk Bryan Award is the annual award of the Quaternary Geology and Geomorphology Division of the Geological Society of America. It is named after Kirk Bryan a pioneer in geomorphology of arid regions. The award was established in 1951 and is bestowed upon the author or authors of a published paper of distinction advancing the science of geomorphology or some related field.

List of Recipients

2020 Martha Cary "Missy" Eppes and Russ Keanini
2018 Karen B Gran, Noah Finnegan, Andrea L. Johnson, Patrick Belmont, Chad Wittkop
2017 Les McFadden
2016 Chris Goldfinger, C. Hans Nelson, Ann E. Morey, Joel E. Johnson, Jason R. Patton, Eugene Karabanov, Julia Gutiérrez-Pastor, Andrew T. Eriksson, Eulàlia Gràcia, Gita Dunhill, Randolph J. Enkin, Audrey Dallimore, and Tracy Vallier
2015 Daniel Muhs, Kathleen Simmons, Randall Schumann, Lindsey Groves, Jerry Mitrovica, DeAnna Laurel
2014 John C. Ridge, Greg Balco, Robert L. Bayless, Catherine C. Beck, Laura B. Carter, Jody L. Dean, Emily B. Voytek and Jeremy H. Wei
2013 P.K. House, P.A. Pearthree, and M.E. Perkins
2012  Neal R. Iverson, Thomas S. Hooyer, Jason F. Thomason, Matt Graesch, and Jacqueline R. Shumway
2011  Robert C. Walter and Dorothy J. Merritts
2010  Rolfe D. Mandel 
2009  Ellen Wohl
2008  Jon J. Major 
2007  Marith Cady Reheis, A.M. Sarna-Wojcicki, R.L. Reynolds, C.A. Repenning, and M.D. Mifflin 
2006  David R. Montgomery 
2005  John C. Gosse and Fred M. Phillips 
2004  Stephen C. Porter 
2003  Michael R. Waters, and C. Vance Haynes 
2002  Frank J. Pazzaglia and Mark T. Brandon 
2001  Richard M. Iverson 
2000  Brian Atwater and Eileen Hemphill-Haley 
1999  William L. Graf 
1998  Vance T. Holliday 
1997  Grant A. Meyer, Stephen G. Wells, and A.J. Timothy Jull
1996  Roger T. Saucier 
1995  James E. O'Connor 
1994  Arthur N. Palmer 
1993  William B. Bull 
1992  R. Dale Guthrie 
1991  Milan J. Pavich 
1990  Arthur S. Dyke and Victor K. Prest 
1989  Kevin M. Scott 
1988  Peter W. Birkeland 
1987  Richard B. Waitt 
1986  Ronald I. Dorn and Theodore M. Oberlander 
1985  No award given
1984  Steven M. Colman 
1983  Leland H. Gile, John W. Hawley, Robert B. Grossman 
1982  Kenneth L. Pierce 
1981  J. Ross Mackay 
1980  James A. Clark, William E. Farrell, and W. Richard Peltier
1979  Stanley A. Schumm 
1978  Richard L. Hay 
1977  Michael A. Church 
1976  Geoffrey S. Boulton 
1975  James B. Benedict 
1974  Robert V. Ruhe 
1973  John T. Andrews
1972  Dwight R. Crandell 
1971  A. Lincoln Washburn
1970  Harold E. Malde 
1969  Ronald L. Shreve 
1968  David M. Hopkins 
1967  Clyde A. Wahrhaftig 
1966  Charles S. Denny 
1965  Gerald M. Richmond 
1964  Robert P. Sharp
1963  Arthur H. Lachenbruch 
1962  Anders Rapp 
1961  John T. Hack 
1960  John F. Nye 
1959  Jack L. Hough 
1958  Luna B. Leopold and Thomas J. Maddock, Jr.

See also

List of geology awards
Prizes named after people

References

http://rock.geosociety.org/qgg/

Geological Society of America
American science and technology awards
Geology awards